Melissodes is a genus of long-horned bees in the family Apidae. There are 129 described species in Melissodes.

ITIS Taxonomic note:
The gender of the name "Melissodes" has traditionally been considered as feminine by taxonomists. However, ICZN Commissioner Doug Yanega (in litt., May 2008) has indicated that the sex should be masculine under ICZN Art. 30.1.4.4, which explicitly states that all genera ending in "-odes" are masculine unless the original author declared otherwise. Since Latreille did not specify a gender when proposing the name in 1829, this Code Article applies in this case.

See also
 List of Melissodes species

References

Further reading

External links

 

Apinae
Bee genera